Typhoon Ofelia, known as Typhoon Bising in the Philippines, was the first of two typhoons in 1990 to directly affect the Philippines within a week. Typhoon Ofelia originated from an area of disturbed weather embedded in the monsoon trough situated near the Caroline Islands. Slowly organizing, the disturbance tracked westward, and was designated a tropical depression on June 15. After an increase in convection, the depression was upgraded into a tropical storm on June 17. On June 19, Ofelia turned northwest and after development of a central dense overcast, Ofelia was upgraded into a typhoon late on June 20. After turning north, Ofelia obtained its maximum intensity following the development of an eye. The typhoon skirted past the northeastern tip of Luzon and near the east coast of Taiwan, commencing a rapid weakening trend. On the evening on June 23, Ofelia struck the southern portion of Zhejiang. The storm then began to track north, recurving towards the Korean Peninsula. The storm tracked through the province of Jiangsu, and at 00:00 UTC on June 24, transitioned into an extratropical cyclone, only to merge with a frontal zone on June 25.

Although the inner core avoided the Philippines, the storm's large size resulted in inundation across the northern Philippines. The province of La Union was the hardest hit by the typhoon, where 22 people were killed and 90 homes were crushed. Three children perished and six others sustained injuries in Pasig. Overall, 56 people were killed and over 85,000 individuals were forced to flee their homes. Hualien City was the hardest hit by the typhoon, where five people were killed. In all, Ofelia was the worst to hit eastern Taiwan in 30 years. Roads and highways were blocked by landslides and floods. Agricultural losses exceeded NT$2.55 billion (US$94.7 million). Seventeen people died and twenty-three were missing due to flooding and mudslides. Although during a weakening phase at the time, the typhoon drenched central China. In Wenzhou, 12 people were killed and monetary damage was estimated at 205 million RMB (US$42.8 million). In the province of Zhejiang, 15 fatalities were reported and 21 others were injured. In the neighboring province of Fujian, 15 people perished and 9,044 houses were demolished. About  of farmland were inundated and damage was estimated at 338 million RMB (US$70.5 million). Nationwide, 40 people were killed by Ofelia.

Meteorological history

Typhoon Ofelia, the third typhoon of the season and first of June, originated from the monsoon trough situated near the Caroline Islands. Eighteen hours later the Japan Meteorological Agency (JMA) upgraded the system into a tropical depression. Initially, the depression tracked westward along the periphery of a subtropical ridge and in an environment of high wind shear that slowed the rate of organization. Following an increase in convection and curved banding features and an improvement in outflow, the JTWC issued a tropical cyclone formation alert for the system on the morning of June 17. An increase in organization warranted the JTWC to classify the system as a tropical depression at noon that day. At 18:00 UTC on June 17, the JMA opted to upgrade the depression into a tropical storm. Based on a Dvorak intensity estimate of T2.5/, the JTWC upgraded the depression into a tropical storm at 00:00 UTC on June 18.

Initially, the JTWC forecast Ofelia to move generally westward because many tropical cyclone forecast models showed a strong ridge to its north. Instead Ofelia slowed down and turned northwest on June 19 due to a surge in the southwesterly monsoon trough. Ofelia gradually deepened, and by 00:00 UTC on June 20, the JMA elected to upgrade Ofelia into a severe tropical storm. Intensifying at a slower than climatological pace, Ofelia continued northwest as it rounded a subtropical ridge. On June 22, Ofelia began to turn north.

The typhoon skirted past the northeastern tip of Luzon near peak intensity. It then turned northward, striking the east coast of Taiwan. Rapid weakening commenced due to land interaction, and at noon on June 23, the JMA lowered Ofelia to below typhoon strength, with the JTWC doing the same six hours later. Late on June 23, Ofelia struck the southern portion of Zhejiang. The storm then began to turn north and eventually recurve towards the Korean Peninsula. The storm tracked through the province of Jiangsu, and at 00:00 UTC on June 24 the JMA declared Ofelia an extratropical cyclone. According to the JTWC, however, this did not take place until 00:00 UTC on June 25 when the system moved offshore and merged with a frontal zone.

Preparations, impact, and aftermath

Philippines
Despite remaining offshore northern Luzon, the storm's broad circulation enhanced the southwest monsoon that inundated much of the northern Philippines. Due to the impeding threat of Ofelia, authorities issued storm warnings for 13 provinces. Offshore, small craft advisories were issued. All storm warnings were discontinued on June 23 as the storm moved away.

The province of La Union was the hardest hit by the typhoon. There, 22 people were killed, including a 60-year-old man and a child that were killed via a landslide in Caba, where 90 homes were destroyed. Throughout the province damage totaled P20 million (US$833,000). In Pangasinan, west of La Union, two people were electrocuted.  Three children died and six others suffered injuries in their homes due to heavy rains in Pasig. A 4-year-old girl died in a landslide in the mountain resort city of Baguio. Philippine Airlines cancelled five domestic flights to and from Manila while schools were closed in the capital and other affected areas. Storm surge toppled a seawall there and much of the city lost power. Offshore Manila, Provider and the Kootenay were stranded and necessitated rescue. Well to the south of Manila, lightning killed two people in Lanao del Sur. In all, 56 people were killed and 14 others were wounded in the country. Moreover, 270 homes were destroyed and over 2,000 were damaged. A total of 85,000 individuals were forced to flee their homes as a result of flooding.

In response to the storm, the Philippine Red Cross ordered its chapters to provide relief to affected areas. Furthermore, the agency provided 200 sacks of goods, 100 cartons of sardines, and 200 cartons of rice. A few days after Ofelia, Typhoon Percy passed through the country.

Taiwan
Taiwan, on the other hand, took a direct hit from Ofelia, with floodwater levels reaching  in some places. Six people were killed, including five in drownings, and thirty were injured in Hualien City, which was hardest hit by the typhoon. There, a dike was destroyed, causing 500 individuals to be stranded. Much of the area lost electricity, water and telephone service and crop damage amounted to US$5 million. In nearby villages, four people were deemed missing and eight others were wounded. In the harbor of Hualien, a 10,900-metric-ton (12,000-short-ton) freighter, Cahaya, broke into three sections, though all 24 crewmen were unharmed. In addition, a 7,000-metric-ton (7,700-short-ton) freighter, Juliana, ran aground. All 28 sailors aboard were rescued, but three of them sustained minor injuries. Overall, more than 30 people required rescue during the course of the typhoon. All domestic flights were cancelled in Taiwan during the passage of the typhoon. Roads and highways were blocked by landslides and floods. Agricultural losses exceeded NT$2.55 billion (US$94.7 million). Seventeen people died and twenty-three were deemed missing in the ensuing flooding and mudslides.

China
After battering the Philippines and Taiwan, the typhoon dropped  of precipitation in parts of central China. Across Wenzhou, 12 people were killed. A total of 215 homes received damage and 220 boats were swamped. Monetary damage was estimated at 205 million RMB (US$42.8 million). Elsewhere, an elderly woman was crushed under a collapsing wall in Shanghai. Throughout the province, 15 people were killed and 21 people were injured. In the neighboring province of Fujian, at least 15 people perished and 9,044 houses were demolished. About  of farmland were inundated and damage was estimated at 338 million RMB (US$94.7 million). Overall, 56 people were killed and 148 were injured in the country.

See also

Typhoon Irma (1985)
Typhoon Matmo (2014)

Notes

References

External links

1990 Pacific typhoon season
Typhoons
1990 disasters in the Philippines
1990 disasters in China
Typhoons in the Philippines